Saga Vanninen (born 4 May 2003) is a Finnish athlete who specializes in the heptathlon. She was the gold medallist at the World Athletics U20 Championships in 2021, and Cali 22.

Competition record

References

External links 
 

Living people
2003 births
Finnish heptathletes
World Athletics U20 Championships winners
Sportspeople from Tampere
21st-century Finnish women